Mary Ann is the first studio album recorded by Puerto Rican singer Mary Ann Acevedo.  The first single of this album are Mírame.

Track listing

Notes
 Track listing and credits from album booklet.

Singles
 "Mirame" is the first single from Mary Ann's first studio album. The song was written by Guillermo Torres, produced by Bob Benozzo and recorded in Altavoz Studio and Lele Studio at Italy. This is the story of a woman, who need to let know her man, that she loves him, she need him more than ever, that she can't live without him and reminded each time they have lived together. Here the woman expresses the infinite love totally to Him, so deep is their love which goes to where the sun touches the sea. Wishing well to recover each minute of their lives and their love re-emerge among them as the first time. On May 2, 2009 Mary Ann Acevedo sang this song, in a duet with Hannaní Peraza, and they had a "standing ovation" of the people, this is the first time that the song "Mirame", is presented on the stage of Objetivo Fama. This song has a new version, the "merengue version".  The song can only be obtained through digital download on Mary Ann Fan Club's website; this song was not included on the album as official track, it is a bonus track.
 "Que Ironía", written by Eduardo Reyes, Camarena and produced by Guillermo Torres is the second single of this debut album. The music video was released on January 19, 2007 in a worldwide television premiere on Anda Pa'l Cara, a television show on Univisión Puerto Rico. Also the music video was recorded on the studio of APC at Guaynabo, Puerto Rico.
 "Débil" (Spanish for "Weak") is the third single from Mary Ann's first studio album. Débil was written by Rudy Pérez and Omar Sánchez and it was previously a "hit" by Yolandita Monge off the album "Vivencias" in 1988.

Release history

Personnel

Vocals: Mary Ann Acevedo
Background vocals: Mirna Vale, Nashali Enchautegui, Junny Ramos, Rawy Torres, Tairon Aguilera, Danilo Ballo, Cinzia Astolfi, Eddie Tomas, Jeannie Cruz
Keyboards: Martin Nieves, Guillermo Torres, Bob Benozzo, Maurizio Campo
Bass: Ricky Encarnacion, Francesco Puglisi
Guitar: Jorge Laboy, Andres Castro, Simone Chivilo, Davide Aru, Rawy Torres, Tairon
Violin: Karlo Flores, Zeida Garcia, Fernando Medina, Juan Carlos Menendez, Yahaira O'Neill, Lilibeth Rivera, Sandra Rodriguez, Frank Torres, Andres Valcarcel
Viola: Emanuel Olivieri, Marta Hernandez, Maria Santiago
Cello: Harry Almodovar, Sheila Ortiz
Drums: Efrain Martinez, Lele Melotti, Luca Tricoli
Percussion: Jhon Pierre Lamoutt
Hammond Organ: Jose Nelson

Production

Executive Producer: George Zamora, Guillermo Torres
Associates Producers: Sergio George, Ramon Martinez, Carlos Velazquez, Bob Benozzo, Rawy Torres, Eduardo Reyes
Mastering: Roberto "IL MAC" Maccagno (REM Studio, Italy)
Engineers: Ramon Martinez, Carlos Velazquez, Marteen, Israel "PT" Nijera, Sabino Cannone, Bob Benozzo, Danilo Ballo, Mauricio Campo, George Mena
Recorded and Mixed: Playbach Recording, La Casa Studios

Photography: Edwin David Cordero
Art Direction and design: Wewx Collazo (Arte Grafico &..)
Stylist: Juan Angel Pacheco
Makeup: Juan Angel Pacheco

Locations and studios
Recording locations and studios included:
 Altavox Studio - (Milan, Italy)
 Lele Studio - (Velate, Italy)
 Zone Productions - (Miami, FL)
 Audio Vision Recording Studios - (Miami, FL)
 REM Studio - (Bra, Italy)
 Love House Music - (New Jersey)

References

Mary Ann Acevedo albums
Albums produced by Sergio George
2006 albums